Hyperstoma wittmeri, is a species of firefly beetle endemic to Sri Lanka.

Description
Average length is about 5.2-5.5 mm. The 1 to 6 antennomeres are yellow to light brown in color and 7 to 11 antennomeres are dark brown. Penultimate abdominal tergum is rounded basally. Male genitalia possess a V-shaped phallobase with robust paramerae. Phallus circular distally with round apex.

References 

Lampyridae
Insects of Sri Lanka
Beetles described in 2011